There have been several USCGC (United States Coast Guard Cutter) named Northland:
  served in the U.S. Coast Guard from 1927–1946. She was designed for Arctic patrol and served in World War II.
 , is a medium endurance cutter based out of Portsmouth, Virginia.

United States Coast Guard ship names